Valentin Pfeil (born 17 July 1988) is an Austrian long distance runner. He competed in the men's marathon at the 2017 World Championships in Athletics. In 2018, he competed in the men's marathon at the 2018 European Athletics Championships held in Berlin, Germany. He did not finish his race.

References

External links

1988 births
Living people
Austrian male long-distance runners
Austrian male marathon runners
World Athletics Championships athletes for Austria
Place of birth missing (living people)
Athletes (track and field) at the 2015 European Games
European Games gold medalists for Austria
European Games medalists in athletics